Cerțești is a commune in Galați County, Western Moldavia, Romania with a population of 2,209 people. It is composed of three villages: Cârlomănești, Cerțești, and Cotoroaia.

Natives
 George Ivașcu (1911–1988), journalist, literary critic, and communist militant

References

Communes in Galați County
Localities in Western Moldavia